The women's solo artistic swimming competition at the 2002 Asian Games in Busan was held on 30 September and 1 October at the Sajik Swimming Pool.

Schedule
All times are Korea Standard Time (UTC+09:00)

Results

References

External links 
2002 Asian Games Official Report, Page 247
Solo Technical Routine Final
Solo Free Routine Final

Artistic swimming at the 2002 Asian Games